Television Blong Vanuatu (TBV) is a digital service that is now a joint business venture between BTC and Guilin CEKE Communication Equipment Co Ltd, a Chinese private company that is specialized in digital television. Their studios and offices are located in Port Vila.

This broadcasting station is government-owned and affiliated.

It was established in 1993 with the help of Radio France Overseas (RFO) and used to broadcast six hours daily in French and English.

Now Television Blong Vanuatu broadcasts in the Chinese Digital TV standard DTMB (Digital Terrestrial Multimedia Broadcast) which is not compatible with any of the TVs used by the local residents. Customers are required to purchase a Set Top Box from the VBTC in order to see their channels, most of which are Chinese.

Telsat Pacific is a locally owned DVB-T2 UHF Pay TV service that also broadcasts Free-to-Air local channels such as 1NOMO (Project of Telsat Pacific) and KAM TV (Community Akses Media produced by Mark Lowen) which can be received by any Australian or New Zealand standard Digital TV. (www.telsat.vu)

References

Television stations in Vanuatu
Television channels and stations established in 1993